Eodorcadion exaratum is a species of beetle in the family Cerambycidae. It was described by Édouard Ménétries in 1854. It is known from Mongolia.

Subspecies
 Eodorcadion exaratum argali (Jakovlev, 1890)
 Eodorcadion exaratum exaratum (Ménétries, 1854)

References

Dorcadiini
Beetles described in 1854